The 1928 Yale Bulldogs football team represented Yale University in the 1928 college football season. The Bulldogs finished with a 4–4 record under first-year head coach Mal Stevens.

Schedule

References

Yale
Yale Bulldogs football seasons
Yale Bulldogs football